Tephritis spreta is a species of tephritid or fruit flies in the genus Tephritis of the family Tephritidae.

Distribution
Egypt.

References

Tephritinae
Insects described in 1861
Diptera of Africa